Simen Bolkan Nordli (born 25 December 1999) is a Norwegian professional footballer who plays as a midfielder for Danish Superliga club Randers FC.

Club career
He played youth football for Ottestad before joining larger neighbours HamKam, eventually going on to represent Norway as a youth and U21 international.

On 2 January 2020, Aalesunds FK announced the signing of Nordli on a three-year contract. At the end of July 2022 Danish Superliga club Randers FC confirmed, that Nordli would join the club from the beginning of 2023, signing a 3,5-year contract.

Career statistics

References

1999 births
Living people
People from Elverum
Sportspeople from Innlandet
Norwegian footballers
Association football midfielders
Norway youth international footballers
Norway under-21 international footballers
Hamarkameratene players
Aalesunds FK players
Randers FC players
Norwegian First Division players
Eliteserien players
Norwegian expatriate footballers
Norwegian expatriate sportspeople in Denmark
Expatriate men's footballers in Denmark